Kyriakos Alexandridis (born 8 May 1961) is a Greek former professional footballer who played as a midfielder.

Since retiring, he has worked as a scout for PAOK Academy.

Honours
PAOK
Greek Championship: 1985

References 

1961 births
Living people
Footballers from Thessaloniki
People from Thessaloniki (regional unit)
Greek footballers
PAOK FC players
Aris Thessaloniki F.C. players
Doxa Drama F.C. players
Super League Greece players
Association football midfielders
PAOK FC non-playing staff